Karres is a municipality and a village in the district of Imst in Austria and is located 2.5 km east of Imst near the mouth of the Pitze River. The village was founded in the Middle Ages because of mining. It has 589 inhabitants.

Population

References

External links
 

Cities and towns in Imst District